Felix Holtmann (born December 5, 1944) is a Canadian former politician.  He served in the House of Commons of Canada from 1984 to 1993, as a member of the Progressive Conservative Party.

Holtmann was born in Rosser, Manitoba, and educated at the University of Manitoba, Warren College and Jessups School of Advanced Dairy Science. He received a diploma of agriculture, and worked as a farmer. Before entering political life, he was a member of various hog marketing and advisory boards.

He was first elected to the House of Commons in the 1984 federal election, defeating New Democratic Party incumbent Terry Sargeant by 662 votes in Selkirk—Interlake amid a national landslide victory for the PC Party under Brian Mulroney. He was re-elected by an increased plurality in the 1988 election, for the redistributed riding of Portage—Interlake. During his time as a parliamentarian, Holtmann served as a backbench supporter of the Mulroney and Kim Campbell governments.

He was defeated in the 1993 election, finishing third against Liberal candidate Jon Gerrard. He attempted a comeback in the 1997 election, but lost to Liberal John Harvard in Charleswood—Assiniboine. He also sought the nomination of the Canadian Alliance party in the new riding of Portage—Lisgar for the 2000 election but lost to Brian Pallister who went on to win the seat in the general election.

Holtmann was arrested on drunk driving charges in 2002. Although he admitted drinking that night, he denied being impaired. He was acquitted by the courts on April 26, 2007 with the judge saying that although there was some evidence of impairment, there was still room for reasonable doubt. On the evening of June 4, 2015 Holtmann was arrested for drunk driving. He went to court on September 3, 2015. The judge in the case Lynne Stannard told Holtmann, "I don’t see a lot of 70-year-old people in court because they have figured it out, at your age, you should know better and shame on you for not." Stannard fined Holtmann $1,600 and prohibited him from driving for one year.

Election results

References

1944 births
Living people
Members of the House of Commons of Canada from Manitoba
Progressive Conservative Party of Canada MPs